Toni Kari Mikael Kallio (born 9 August 1978) is a Finnish football coach and a former player. He is the manager of Ilves in Veikkausliiga. His preferred position as a player was left back, but he also operated as centre back and used to play as forward when he joined HJK. His nickname is "Bonecrusher", coming from his great physical presence and playing style.

Club career
He started out as a winger, but during his time at Norwegian club Molde was changed into a defender. He is known for his forward runs and good heading, given his tall frame. However, he is also known for making occasional blunders in the national team as he has been forced to play out of his preferred position.

Before joining Molde he played for FC Jazz, TPV Tampere and HJK Helsinki in Finland's Veikkausliiga. He won the Norwegian Cup in 2005. In 2007, he briefly went on trial at Lokomotiv Moscow and played 3 times. In 2007, he moved to Young Boys in Switzerland.

On 31 January 2008, Kallio joined Fulham on loan, together with Jari Litmanen. He made his Fulham debut the following season against Arsenal, in which he helped secure a 1–0 victory. He was immediately awarded the Man of the Match award by visitors of the BBC website.  On 3 July 2008, Kallio signed a two-year deal with Fulham.

Kallio joined Sheffield United on a one-month loan deal in late November 2009, making his debut just over a week later at Plymouth. After making two appearances, Sheffield United extended his loan deal until the end of January 2010 but just hours after Roy Hodgson recalled Kallio due to injuries in defence.

On 1 February 2010, Kallio once again joined the Blades on loan until the end of the season.

On 1 July 2010, Fulham announced that Kallio had been released from his contract with Fulham.

After being released by Fulham, Kallio joined Norway's Tippeligaen side Viking for the rest of the 2010 season. But after making only one appearance as a substitute for the club, the 32-year-old defender was released from his contract on 16 November 2010.

Kallio signed a contract at the beginning of year 2011 with Thai Premier League side Muangthong United F.C. which won the Premier League title on season 2010.

On 19 May 2011 Muangthong United F.C. has been terminated contract. Kallio joined Finnish Premier League side FC Inter Turku on 8 June 2011.

On 18 January 2012 it was announced that he would join Ilves in Finnish second division.

Kallio announced his retirement on 3 October 2013.

Coaching career
He was promoted to the position of the head coach of Ilves after serving as an assistant for several years. Late in 2021, his contract was extended for the 2022 and 2023 season, with an option for 2024.

Career statistics

International

International goals
Finland's score given first. As of 18 August 2011.

References

External links
 
 
  
 
 

1978 births
Living people
Footballers from Tampere
Finnish footballers
Association football defenders
FC Jazz players
Helsingin Jalkapalloklubi players
Molde FK players
BSC Young Boys players
Fulham F.C. players
Sheffield United F.C. players
Viking FK players
Toni Kallio
FC Inter Turku players
FC Ilves players
Veikkausliiga players
Eliteserien players
Swiss Super League players
Premier League players
Toni Kallio
Finland international footballers
Finland youth international footballers
Finland under-21 international footballers
Finnish expatriate footballers
Finnish expatriate sportspeople in Norway
Finnish expatriate sportspeople in Switzerland
Finnish expatriate sportspeople in England
Finnish expatriate sportspeople in Thailand
Expatriate footballers in Norway
Expatriate footballers in Switzerland
Expatriate footballers in England
Expatriate footballers in Thailand
Finnish football managers